Human is a surname of German and English origin which is particularly common in South Africa, the United States and Australia, and may refer to:

 John Human (1912–1991), English cricketer
 Roger Human (1909–1942), English cricketer
 Shirene Human (born 1980), South African figure skater
 Daan Human (born 1976), South African rugby union footballer
 Kost Human, South African rugby league footballer
 Pote Human (born 1959), South African rugby union footballer

See also
Humann